Jalan Tanjung Tuan (Negeri Sembilan state route N167) is a major road in Negeri Sembilan, Malaysia. It is a main route to Tanjung Tuan, an exclave in Melaka side.

List of junctions

Roads in Negeri Sembilan